Anders Run Natural Area is a  protected area in Warren County, Pennsylvania.  It is part of Cornplanter State Forest.

Although parts of the natural area were logged during the first two decades of the 19th century, tree rings of fallen trees have revealed 200-year-old white pines and 400-year-old hemlocks.

In addition to its forests, the Natural Area also has a stream with native trout and fine stands of wildflowers.  There is a historic residence on the property built in 1841 called the "Little Stone House," though in recent years the structure has fallen into a severe state of disrepair.

See also
List of old growth forests

References

Old-growth forests
Protected areas of Warren County, Pennsylvania